Purandara Dasa (IAST: Purandara dāsa) ( 1470 –  1565) was a Haridasa philosopher from present-day Karnataka, India. He was a follower of Madhvacharya's Dvaita philosophy. He was a composer, singer and one of the chief founding-proponents of Carnatic music (Karnataka classical music). In honor of his significant contributions to Carnatic music, he is widely referred to as the Pitamaha (lit. "father" or "grandfather") of Carnatic music. According to a legend, he is considered as an incarnation of Saint Narada.

Purandara Dasa was a wealthy merchant of gold, silver and other miscellaneous jewellery from Karnataka, who gave away all his material riches to become a Haridasa (literally meaning a servant of Lord Hari or Lord Krishna), a devotional singer who made the difficult Sanskrit tenets of Bhagavata Purana available to everyone in simple and melodious songs. He was one of the most important music scholars of medieval India. He formulated the basic lessons of teaching Carnatic music by structuring graded exercises known as Svaravalis and Alankaras, and at the same time, he introduced the raga Mayamalavagowla as the first scale to be learnt by beginners in the field – a practice that is still followed today. He also composed Gitas (simple songs) for novice students.

Purandara Dasa is noted for composing Dasa Sahithya, as a Bhakti movement vocalist, and a music scholar. His practice was emulated by his younger contemporary, Kanakadasa. Purandara Dasa's Carnatic music compositions are mostly in Kannada, though some are in Sanskrit. He signed his compositions with the ankitanama (pen name) "Purandara Vittala" (Vittala is another name of Lord Krishna, one of the incarnations of the Lord Vishnu) and this same form of Lord Krishna is his aaradhya daiva or ishta murthi or worshippable deity. His work was appreciated by many scholars of his time and the later scholars.

Biography
Inscriptional evidence suggests Purandara Dasa was born to a diamond merchant in a Kannada Deshastha Madhva Brahmin family, in 1470 CE in Purandara gada,18 kms far from pune present-day Maharashtra state. According to other opinions, his native town was Purandaraghatta in Karnataka, or Purandaragad near Pune, but the latter is considered a historical mistake – connecting his "pen name" (his ankita) with a location that mainly served as a military encampment in the 15th and 16th century. In 2018, a five-member committee set up by the Government of Karnataka to ascertain the birthplace of Purandara Dasa has submitted its report asserting Tirthahalli as the likeliest candidate. The committee included veteran singer and musicologist RK Padmanabha, scholars Aralumallige Parthasarathi, AV Navada, Veeranna Rajora, and former minister Leeladevi Navada. It is now ascertained that Purandharadasa was born in Araga, Vijayanagara Empire (Modern Day Thirthahalli, Karnataka, India), Karnataka

Purandara Dasa was the only son of the wealthy merchant Varadappa Nayaka and his wife Rukmini. He was named Srinivasa Nayaka, after the patron deity of Venkateswara Temple, Tirumala. He acquired proficiency in Kannada, Sanskrit, and sacred music through education.  At the age of 16, he was married to Saraswati Bai, traditionally described as a pious young girl. He lost his parents at age 20, thereby inheriting his father's business of gemstones and pawning. He prospered and became known as Navakoti Narayana (an abundantly rich man; worth ninety millions).

Popular legend narrates a miraculous incident in Srinivaasa Nayaka's life, owing to which he was led to devote himself to the practice, propagation and inculcation of bhakti (devotion) towards Lord Krishna through musical compositions. As a natural, inescapable consequence of such a transforming event, ubiquitous in the lives of several saints throughout the ages, he is believed to have relinquished his former greedy and miserly self, having realized the worthlessness of attachment to worldly possessions: The Lord, in a bid to cure Srinivaasa of his tenacious materialistic delusion and attachment, and thereby claim his devotion to Himself, approached Srinivaasa in the guise of a poor man, with a piteous plea for money; ostensibly, the money was direly needed to perform His son's 'upanayana'(sacred-thread investiture ceremony).

Having been summarily rejected, mocked and turned out, the 'poor man' surreptitiously repeated his plea before Srinivaasa's wife; a generous soul of rigorous spiritual nature, she gave away one of her precious nose rings, unbeknownst to her husband; the 'poor man' sold the nose ring back to none other than Srinivaasa himself! The shrewd Srinivaasa, privy to his wife's openhandedness, immediately identified the nose ring as his wife's and hurried home; enraged and anxious to ascertain the truth of the matter, he demanded his wife to produce the nose ring before him immediately.

Realizing that Srinivaasa had grown wise to her secret donation, the wife decided to end her life with poison. Having completed her prayers to the Lord before her attempt, she was shocked to see a nose ring inside the poison cup – completely identical to the one she had just given away. Incredulous and rapturous, she recounted the entire episode to her husband, who was bewildered and lost. Meanwhile, a search for the 'poor man' was of no avail; he had as mysteriously vanished as he had appeared! At that very propitious moment, Srinivaasa's old self – convinced of the inscrutable ways of the Lord, having witnessed the unfailing grace that saved his pious wife, bewildered at the power that could, in a moment, produce a gold ornament by mere will – instantly shook off that beginning-less, persistent veil in the form of 'I' and 'mine', which masks most men's vision of the divine. At 30 years of age, he gave away all his wealth in charity, and together with his family, abandoned his house to lead the life of a mendicant – living on alms and singing the glories of the Lord. In his very first song composition, he laments his wasted life of indulgence. It begins with the words "Ana lae kara" in the Shuddha Saveri raga, set to Triputa tala.

In the course of his wandering he met the holy sage Vyasatirtha, one of the chief exponents of Madhwa philosophy and the Rajaguru of Krishnadevaraya, emperor of the Vijayanagara Empire. According to Prof. Sambamoorthy, Srinivasa had his formal initiation at the hands of Vyasatirtha in 1525 when he was about 40 years old, with the name Purandara Daasa bestowed on him.  Purandara Daasa traveled extensively through the length and breadth of the Vijayanagara Empire and Pandharapur in Maharashtra composing and rendering soul-stirring songs in praise of God. He spent his last years in Hampi and also sang songs in Krishnadevaraya's court. The mantapa (mandap) in which he stayed is known as Purandara Daasa Mantapa (mandap) in Hampi. He died on 2 January 1565 at the age of 95. Within a short period after his death, Vijayanagara Empire collapsed. Tradition and legend hold that he composed  keerthanas (songs). Further, according to this legend, his original desire was to compose 500,000 keerthanas. Being unable to do it in his present life, he requested his younger son to complete them. His son Madhwapathi told his father that he could do this in his next janma (birth). It is believed that he was reborn as the famous Vijayadasa—birthplace is Cheekalparvi village near Maanvi town, Raichur district in Karnataka State—and completed the remaining 25 thousand keerthanas as promised. Most of his songs are in praise of Lord Narayana and other Devatas.  Due to this, he is believed to be an avatar of Naarada, the celestial singer and son of Goddess Saraswati. One of the trimurtis (three icons) of Carnaatic music, Saint Thyagaraja, has paid tribute to Purandara Daasa in his geya natakam (an opera) Prahlada Bhakti Vijayam.

Influence on Carnatic music
Purandara Dasa systematized the method of teaching Carnatic music which is followed to the present day. Another contribution was the fusion of bhava, raga, and laya in his compositions. He included comments on ordinary daily life and elements of colloquial language in his lyrics. He introduced folk ragas into the mainstream, setting his lyrics to ragas of his day so that even a common man could learn and sing them. He also composed a number of lakshya and lakshana geetas, many of which are sung to this day. His sooladis are regarded musical masterpieces and are the standard for raga lakshana. Scholars attribute the standardization of  entirely to Purandara Dasa.

Travelling Haridasa successors are said to have followed the systems he devised, orally transmitted his compositions. According to traditional sources, his compositions numbers as many as 4,75,000. His original collection of songs is referred to as Purandaropanishat  as given by Vyasatirtha out of which only 1000 are available right now.

Shri.Dasa was a vaggeyakara (composer-performer), a lakshanakara (musicologist), and the founder of musical pedagogy. Musicologists call him the Sangeeta Pitamaha (lit. "grandfather") of Carnatic music.

Social reforms
Purandara Dasa tried to reform existing social practices and preached through devotional songs in the local Kannada language. Most of his keertanas deal with social reform and pinpoint the defects in society. The philosophy of Purandara Dasa is harmonious with the concept of bhakti in Hinduism, broadly based on the Narada Bhakti Sutras and essentially synchronous with the pan-Indian Bhakti movement.  It teaches complete self-surrender and unadulterated love towards God. The philosophy of Bhakti in Purandara Dasa's compositions stems from the essential teachings of the realistic-pluralistic Madhva Philosophy of Vaishnavism, and has been rendered in simple Kannada. The individual soul (jeeva) is a pratibimba (reflection) of the Lord (Vishnu/Ishvara), who is the bimba (source). The jeeva owes its existence, knowledge and bliss to the Ishvara, and any sense of independence with regards to one's actions and the results thereof is to be given up. The mind has to be turned away from transient pleasures and possessions of this world; instead, it is to be turned towards the Lord, who alone is the abode of unadulterated, unswerving bliss. His keerthanas have simple lessons in this regard and implore men to lead the noble life of a Vaishnava.

Casteism
Purandara Dasa fought the evils of casteism through his songs. In his song aavakulavaadarenu aavanadarenu aatma bhavavariyada mele he wonders what is the use if one does not understand the spirit of humanism whatever caste or status one might be accredited to. In the same song when relating to cows of different colours and sugarcane of different shapes he emphasizes that one's birth cannot merely decide the highness or lowness of any individual. He asks will the sweetness of a crooked sugarcane be also crooked or will the milk of cows of many a colour be also of many colours. He asked people to do their best in the world, to provide food and charity to the poor, help others and give up attachments. He was against the caste system, and believed true caste was based on character, not on birth. Sacrifice did not imply the slaughter of animals, but the slaying of one's own bad qualities.

Gender equality
According to Purandara Dasa there were no inequalities among men and women. Both of them had same rights and obligations in their conduct of everyday life as well as observation of pity. Purandara Dasa distinctly described the quality of a virtuous women . According to him, the neck chains, bangles and other ornaments which women wore were not important; the beauty of mind and noble conduct were her true embellishments.

Untouchability
Purandara Dasa made some forceful expressions on untouchability, which was dogging society. His strength comes perhaps from the support of his guru Vyasathirtha with the backing of powerful king Krishnadevaraya of Vijayanagara himself. In one such song Holaya horagithane oorolagillave he opines that an individual should not be branded untouchable on the basis of his/her birth in any specific caste, however it is rather his conduct which should make him untouchable if at all he can be called so. The usage of the word untouchable is not used in the limited context of physical contact with the person, it is the worthlessness of the association with that person which is highlighted here. This is evident by the subsequent expressions in the song which says that one who does not practice self-discipline is untouchable, one who plots against his own government is untouchable, similarly one who shirks charity while having wealth is untouchable, one who poisons to eliminate his opponents is untouchable, one who does not use soft language is untouchable, one who prides over his purity of caste is untouchable and finally one who does not meditate on Purandara Vittala is untouchable. Dasa's message is loud and clear rejecting untouchability in our society. He uses the name of Purandara Vittala to imply any God. This is evident from his other songs on various Gods and Goddesses. Similar ideas were expressed by many other poets also.

Legacy and depictions in popular culture

In contemporary music

In the pure Carnatic tradition, Bidaram Krishnappa was one of the foremost singers of modern times to popularize the compositions of Purandara Dasa. Singer Madras Lalithangi, and her illustrious daughter Padmavibushan, Sangeetha Kalanidhi M. L. Vasanthakumari have rendered yeoman service in propagating the compositions of Purandara Dasa; both were considered as authorities on Purandara Dasa. M. L. Vasantha Kumari was awarded an honorary doctorate by Mysore University for her contributions to Purandara Dasa's music.

Though the compositions of Purandara Dasa are originally in the ragas of the Carnatic system of music, his compositions have been adopted and made equally popular in Hindustani music. Hindustani music legends such as Bhimsen Joshi, Madhav Gudi and Basavaraj Rajguru have made them more popular in recent years.

Classical vocalists and musicians such as Upendra Bhat, Puttur Narasimha Nayak, Venkatesh Kumar, Nagaraja Rao Havaldar, Ganapathi Bhatt, Vidyabhushana, Pravin Godkhindi, Nachiketa Sharma, Sangeetha Katti, and the Bombay Sisters are continuing the tradition of singing and performing Purandara Dasa's compositions and other Dasa Sahitya songs in Carnatic as well as Hindustani music concerts. Of late, Mysore Ramachandracharya is industriously propagating dasa sahitya through his concerts. Tirumala Tirupathi Devasthanams is also propagating the dasa krithis through the Dasa Sahitya Project. He also composed the first lullaby songs in Carnatic music, such as Thoogire Rangana and Gummana Kareyadire, which led to the creation of many similar songs by others.

Memorials and monuments

The Purandara Mantapa adjoining the Vijayavittala temple at Hampi is one of the long standing monuments relating to Purandara Dasa. This is where he is said to have composed and sung in praise of Lord Vishnu.

Purandara Dasa is said to have composed his well known song, ‘Aadisidaleshoda jagadoddharana’ on infant Sri Krishna, in raga Kapi, at the Aprameyaswamy temple in Doddamallur, Channapattana taluk, Karnataka. A small mantapa outside the temple is named after him, where he is said to have stayed as he passed through the village.

A statue of Purandara Dasa has been erected at the foothills of Tirumala in Alipiri. A statue of Purandara Dasa adorns the Asthana Mandapam (auditorium) on the Tirumala hill.

A huge statue of Purandara Dasaru is erected at the holy premises of Uttaradi Matha,Bangalore

Sri Purandara Dasa Memorial Trust (SPDMT), formed in Bangalore in 2007, has been actively involved in promoting and researching all aspects of the life and works of Purandara Dasa. A 3500-square-foot concert hall, called 'Purandara Mantapa', has been erected on the premises of the Trust.

The Indiranagar Sangeetha Sabha (ISS) at Indiranagar, Bangalore formed in 1986, has dedicated an auditorium with a seating capacity of 600 called Purandara Bhavana exclusively for cultural events, inaugurated by Dr. A. P. J. Abdul Kalam, to his memory.

Salutations
 On 14 January 1964, the India Security Press – Department of posts had issued a stamp in honour of Purandarasa Dasa on his 400th death anniversary.
 Tirupati Tirumala Devasthanam has propagated and popularised the literature of Purandara Dasa under the Dasa Sahitya Project.

Biographical movies and documentaries 

Three biographical films, in Kannada language, have been made on the life and compositions of Purandara Dasa.
 Purandaradasa (1937)
 Navakoti Narayana (1964)
 Sri Purandara Dasaru (1967)
 Film director and playwright Girish Karnad made a documentary film titled Kanaka-Purandara (English, 1988) on the two medieval Bhakti poets of Karnataka.

Aradhana

Aradhana is a religious-devotional observation, held annually, to remember and honor saintly persons on the anniversary of the completion of their earthly lives. Purandara Dasa's aradhana or punyadina is held on the pushya bahula amavasya of the Indian chandramana calendar (a new moon day, generally in February–March). Musicians and art aficionados in the state of Karnataka, South India and many art and religious centers around the world observe this occasion with religious and musical fervor. His compositions are sung by established and upcoming artists on this day.

In 2022, aradhanas are happening in India and around the world even to this day.

Compilations of Purandara Dasa's lyrics
 Gaja Vadana Beduve Gowri Thanaya A popular Purandara Dasa composition in Carnatic Raagam Hamsadhwani
 
 KavyaPremi. 1996. Purandara Daasa Haadugalu. Dharwad: Samaja Publishers. Contains ca. 225 songs; in Kannada language.

See also
 Haridasa
 Madhvacharya
 Vyasatirtha
 Kanaka Dasa
 Annamacharya
 Shishunala Sharif
 Puttur Narasimha Nayak
 Dvaita Vedanta
 List of Carnatic composers
 List of Carnatic artists
 List of Carnatic instrumentalists
 Trinity of Carnatic music

References

Cited sources

Further reading
 
 Kassebaum, Gayatri Rajapur. ‘Karnatak raga’ (2000). In 
 Dr. Vasudev Agnihotry "Purandaradasaru mattu Shri Mad Bhagavata Ondu Toulanika Adhyayana" PhD Osmania University Hyderabad, India 1984 Publisher: Samskriti Prakashana Sedam. Keertana Vidya nagar sedam 58522 dist gulbarga Karnataka

External links

 Annual Purandara Dasa and Thyagaraja Aradhana in D.C., Maryland and Virginia
 Bhagyada Lakshmi Baaramma A popular Purandara Dasa composition in Sri Raagam
 Lyrics and translation of Purandaradasa compositions

1470 births
1564 deaths
People from Shimoga district
Carnatic composers
Kannada poets
Indian social reformers
Hindu poets
Dvaita Vedanta
Dvaitin philosophers
Madhva religious leaders
Haridasa
Indian Vaishnavites
16th-century Indian philosophers
History of Karnataka
Kannada people
16th-century Indian poets
Indian male poets
Poets from Karnataka
Madhva Brahmins
Vijayanagara poets
Scholars of Vijayanagara Empire
15th-century Indian philosophers